Cryptospora may refer to:
 Cryptospora (plant), a genus of flowering plants in the family Brassicaceae
 Cryptospora (fungus), a genus of fungi in the family Gnomoniaceae